Alexander Tasman Marshall (11 July 1881 – 18 November 1966) was an Australian politician. He was born in Launceston. In 1914 he was elected to the Tasmanian House of Assembly as a Liberal member for Bass. He became a Nationalist in 1917 and was Chair of Committees from 1922. Marshall was defeated in 1925. He died in Launceston in 1966.

References

1881 births
1966 deaths
Commonwealth Liberal Party politicians
Nationalist Party of Australia members of the Parliament of Tasmania
Members of the Tasmanian House of Assembly
Politicians from Launceston, Tasmania
20th-century Australian politicians